The 2012–13 SD Huesca season is the 54th season in club history.

Review and events

Competitions

Segunda División

League table

Matches

Copa Del Rey

Squad

Squad, matches played and goals scored

Minutes played

Starting 11
1		GK	Nacho Zabal (on loan from Osasuna)
3		MF	Luis Helguera
4		MF	Carlos Lázaro Vallejo (on loan from Valladolid)
5		DF	Rafael Clavero
6		MF	David López
7		MF	Antonio Núñez
8		FW	Daniel Pacheco (on loan from Liverpool)
9		FW	Borja (on loan from Atlético Madrid)
10		MF	Juanjo Camacho
11		MF	Jorge Larena
13		GK	Luis García
14		MF	Marc Martínez
15		MF	Joaquín Sorribas 
No.		Position	Player
16		DF	Sergio Díaz
17		FW	Nacho Novo
18		DF	Carlos Diogo
19		FW	Tariq
20		DF	Alex Pérez (on loan from Getafe)
21		MF	Xavi Annunziata (on loan from Osasuna)
22		DF	David Rivas
23		DF	José Antonio Llamas
24		FW	Jokin
26		DF	Rubén Garcés
31		MF	Juan Carlos (on loan from Deportivo de La Coruña)
	DF	Rubén Párraga

Bookings

Sources

Huesca
SD Huesca seasons